The Twelve Days of Christmas is a comedy album written by Paul Howard as part of the Ross O'Carroll-Kelly series. The title is a reference to a Christmas song of the same name. The project was the idea of Richard Cook.

The CD tells the story of the run-up to Ross's Christmas. It stars Risteárd Cooper (as Ross), Lisa Lambe (as Sorcha), Mark Lambert, Helen Norton, Tara Flynn, Rory Keenan, Karen Ardiff and Paul Howard. Lambe would later play Sorcha in the stage versions of RO'CK: Howard said "Everyone on the CD was great but she was the stand-out. She completely got who Sorcha was."

Track listing

References

Ross O'Carroll-Kelly
2005 albums
2000s comedy albums